Simon Booth (born ) is an English former professional rugby league footballer.

Background
Simon Booth was born in Leigh, Lancashire, England, he was a Physical Education teacher at Sydney Smith School, Hull but the school has since closed due to a schools renovation program. He has now moved on to be a Geography teacher at Sirius Academy North, Hull.

Playing career

Simon Booth played right- in St. Helens' 16–25 defeat by Wigan in the 1995–96 Regal Trophy Final during the 1995–96 at Alfred McAlpine Stadium, Huddersfield on Saturday 13 January 1996.

Post-playing career
He now works as head of year 11 in Sirius Academy North(Hull)

References

External links
Saints Heritage Society profile

1971 births
Living people
English rugby league players
Schoolteachers from Yorkshire
Hull F.C. players
Leigh Leopards players
Rugby league players from Leigh, Greater Manchester
Rugby league second-rows
St Helens R.F.C. players